Ogoron is a rural locality (a settlement) in Ogoronsky Selsoviet of Zeysky District, Amur Oblast, Russia. The population was 278 as of 2018. There are 4 streets.

Geography 
Ogoron is located on Baikal–Amur Mainline, 173 km east of Zeya (the district's administrative centre) by road. Zeya is the nearest rural locality.

References 

Rural localities in Zeysky District